Events in the year 1951 in Turkey.

Parliament
 9th Parliament of Turkey

Incumbents
President – Celal Bayar
Prime Minister – Adnan Menderes
Leader of the opposition – İsmet İnönü

Ruling party and the main opposition
 Ruling party – Democrat Party (DP) 
 Main opposition – Republican People's Party (CHP)

Cabinet
19th government of Turkey (up to 9 March)
20th government of Turkey (from 9 March)

Events
21 January – First convoy of wounded Turkish Brigade soldiers from Korean War arrived in Turkey
26 June – The corpse of the reformist grandvizier Mithat Pasha, who was assassinated in Saudi Arabia in 1883, was buried in İstanbul
2 July – Presidential yacht MV Savarona was transferred to the Turkish Naval Forces
8 August – Halkevleri, a state sponsored enlightenment project, was ended 
13 August – 1951 Kurşunlu earthquake
17 September – Byelections
1 October – Turkish Air Force Academy was founded

Births
16 February – Ferhan Şensoy theatre actor 
5 April, Nedim Gürsel, writer
23 July, Leman Sam, singer
6 September – Melih Kibar, composer
14 December – Nükhet Ruacan, jazz singer
16 December – Aykut Barka, earth scientist specialized in earthquakes

Metin Yurdanur, sculptor

Deaths
3 January – Ali Münif Yeğenağa (born in 1974), politician (Ottoman Empire and Turkey)
26 July – Ali Sami Yen (born in 1886), founder of Galatasaray sports club  
20 August – İzzettin Çalışlar (born in 1882), retired general, who participated in the Turkish War of Independence
31 August – Mazhar Osman Usman (born in 1884), doctor and the founder of Bakırköy Psychiatric Hospital
11 December – Mustafa Muğlalı (born in 1882), retired general, who participated in the Turkish War of Independence

Gallery

References

 
Years of the 20th century in Turkey
Turkey
Turkey
Turkey